Fenfushi as a place name may refer to:
 Fenfushi (Alif Dhaal Atoll) (Republic of Maldives)
 Fenfushi (Raa Atoll) (Republic of Maldives)
 Fenfushi (Thaa Atoll) (Republic of Maldives)